Atractosteus africanus is a  potentially dubious species of gar from the Cretaceous period of Niger and France. The species possibly lived until the end of the Cretaceous, during the Maastrichtian.

References

Lepisosteidae
Cretaceous Niger